Zax may refer to:
Andy Zax, music producer, historian, and information archivist
The Zax, a pair of Dr. Seuss characters from The Sneetches and Other Stories
Zax (Duke Power), a cartoon character used by Duke Power to educate children
Zax (tool), a tool used for pruning slate roofing tiles
Zax: The Alien Hunter, a video game
Zax, the flying robot from the movie Benji, Zax & the Alien Prince

See also 

Gordon Zacks
Sachs
Sachse (disambiguation)
Sacks (surname)
Saks (disambiguation)
Sax (disambiguation)
Saxe (disambiguation)
Small-angle X-ray scattering (SAXS)
Zaks (disambiguation)
Zaks, a building toy
Zaxbys, a chicken finger restaurant headquartered in Athens, Georgia